Kent County,  area 2,458 km2 (949 sq mi) is a historic county in the Canadian province of Ontario. 

The county was created in 1792 and named by John Graves Simcoe in honour of the English County. The county is in an alluvial plain between Lake St. Clair, and Lake Erie, watered by two navigable streams, the Thames River and the Sydenham River.

On January 1, 1998, the county, its townships, towns, and Chatham were amalgamated into the single-tier city of Chatham-Kent.

Original townships

Camden
Area: . Camden Township was conceded by treaty in 1790, and the Gore was surrendered by treaty in 1819. Surveyed in 1794 and named from the Earl of Camden. Also referred to earlier as Camden Township and Gore, and in the 1861 census as Camden & Gore Township. Containing some of the best farmland in Ontario, the township was originally parcelled as a grid with Concessions 1 to 7 running north-westward, Lots 1 to 18 running north-eastward and Concession A along the road to Thamesville. The Gore of Camden is a rectangular section of land in the north and northwest area of the township. The Camden Gore contains Concessions 1 to 14 running eastward and Lots 1 to 10 running northward. The Gore was variously administered by Lambton and Kent counties as the population changed and road improvements were made. Community centres: Dresden, Thamesville

Chatham
Area:  Chatham Township was conceded by treaty in 1790, and the Gore was conceded by treaty in 1796. Surveyed in 1794. Also referred to earlier as Chatham Township and Gore. The township was originally parcelled as a grid with Concessions 1 to 19 running north-westward and Lots 1 to 25 running north-eastward. The Gore of Chatham is a rectangular piece of land in the north-northwest of the township. The Chatham Gore contains four Concessions running northward and 25 Lots running eastward. The Gore was variously administered by Lambton and Kent counties as the population changed and road improvements were made. Community centres: City of Chatham, Wallaceburg

Dover
Area: . Dover Township was named after Dover, England.  It was surveyed in 1794 and incorporated in 1850.  Within the boundaries of Dover along the Chenail Ecarté of the river St. Clair is the site of Lord Selkirk's Baldoon Settlement, established in 1803. Community centres: Mitchell's Bay, Grande Pointe, Dover Centre and Pain Court

Harwich
Area: . Surveyed in 1794 and named from the English port at the mouth of the Thames. A resident of Harwich, Valintine Zimmer, co-founded with friends of the same nationality the German Concession of Harwich. Community centres: Blenheim, Erieau, Erie Beach, Shrewsbury

Howard
Area: . Surveyed in 1794 and named after Thomas Howard, Earl of Effingham, father-in-law of Sir Guy Carleton. Community centres: Morpeth, Ridgetown

Orford
Area: . Surveyed in 1794 and named from the English port of Orford, Suffolk. Community centres: Highgate

Raleigh
Area: . Surveyed in 1794. Likely named for Walter Raleigh. Community centres: Charing Cross

Romney
Area: , Surveyed in 1794. Named for the Kentish port in England. Community centres: Wheatley

Tilbury East
Area: . Surveyed in 1794, named for the English Tilbury fort in Essex. Community centres: Merlin, Tilbury

Zone
Area: . Separated from Orford in 1821 to provide a special organizational district, "the zone", for the Indians of the Moravian Mission on the Thames. Community centres:  Bothwell

Municipalities (as of 1997)
 Town of Chatham: County Seat, largest population centre in the county.
 Town of Blenheim: Incorporated in 1885.
 Town of Bothwell: Incorporated in 1867.
 Town of Dresden: Incorporated in 1882.
 Town of Ridgetown: Incorporated in 1875.
 Town of Tilbury: Incorporated as Village of Tilbury Centre in 1887 and Town of Tilbury in 1910.
 Town of Wallaceburg: Incorporated as a village in 1875 and a town in 1896.
 Village of Erie Beach
 Village of Erieau
 Village of Highgate
 Village of Thamesville
 Village of Wheatley
 Township of Camden
 Township of Chatham
 Township of Dover
 Township of Harwich
 Township of Howard
 Township of Orford
 Township of Raleigh
 Township of Romney
 Township of Tilbury East
 Township of Zone

Notable residents
 W. B. George (1899–1972), president of the Canadian Amateur Hockey Association and agriculturalist at Kemptville Agricultural School, was born in Highgate in Orford Township.

See also
 List of Ontario census divisions
 List of townships in Ontario
 Chatham-Kent, Ontario

References

External links
 1951 map of Kent County

Chatham-Kent
Former counties in Ontario
Southwestern Ontario
States and territories established in 1792
1792 establishments in the British Empire
Populated places disestablished in 1998